Mario Hodžić is a Montenegrin karateka. He won the silver medal in the men's kumite 67 kg event at the 2019 European Games held in Minsk, Belarus.

In the same year, he also won the silver medal in the men's kumite 67 kg event at the 2019 European Karate Championships held in Guadalajara, Spain.

In 2021, he competed at the World Olympic Qualification Tournament held in Paris, France hoping to qualify for the 2020 Summer Olympics in Tokyo, Japan.

Achievements

References 

Living people
Year of birth missing (living people)
Place of birth missing (living people)
Montenegrin male karateka
European Games silver medalists for Montenegro
European Games medalists in karate
Karateka at the 2019 European Games